The 1959 Campeonato Brasileiro Série A (officially the 1959 Taça Brasil) was the 1st edition of the Campeonato Brasileiro Série A. It began on August 23, 1959, and ended on March 29, 1960, in a tie-break match played in Rio de Janeiro, won by Bahia.

Format 
The competition was a single elimination knockout tournament featuring two-legged ties, with a Tie-Breaker if the sides were tied on points (however, if the tie-break was a draw, the aggregate score of the first two legs was used to determine the winner).

Teams 
16 State Champions qualified for the tournament:

Northern Zone

Northeastern Group

Northern Group

Northern Zone Final

Southern Zone

Southern Group

Eastern Group

Southern Zone Final

National Semi-Finals
Santos and Vasco da Gama entered at this point.

National Final

The tie-break was played in Maracanã Stadium, in Rio de Janeiro, on March 29, 1960.
Bahia: Nadinho; Beto, Henrique, Flávio and Neizinho; Vicente and Mário; Marito, Alencar, Léo and Biriba.
Santos: Lalá; Getúlio, Mauro Ramos de Oliveira, Formiga and Zé Carlos; Zito and Mário; Dorval, Pagão (Tite), Coutinho and Pepe.
Goals: Vicente, Léo and Alencar (Bahia) and Coutinho (Santos)
Expulsions: Getúlio, Formiga and Dorval.
Referee: Frederico Lopes, assisted by Airton Vieira de Morais (named "Sansão") and Wilson Lopes de Souza.

References

External links
 1959 Taça Brasil

Brazil
1
Taça Brasil seasons
B